Ali AlQarni is a Saudi astronaut, selected for Axiom Mission 2 by the Saudi Space Commission; his selection was officially announced on February 12, 2023.

He holds a bachelor's degree in aeronautical sciences from King Faisal Air Academy. He is a captain in the Royal Saudi Air Force, where he pilots F-15SA. He logged 2,387 hours of flying.

References

 

21st-century Saudi Arabian people
Living people
Saudi Arabian astronauts
Year of birth missing (living people)